The Löbauer Wasser  is a river of Saxony, Germany. It is a right tributary of the Spree, which it joins near Malschwitz. It flows through Löbau.

See also
List of rivers of Saxony

Rivers of Saxony
Rivers of Germany